During the 1986–87 English football season, Brentford competed in the Football League Third Division. Frank McLintock resigned as manager in January 1987 and his replacement Steve Perryman saved the club's season, elevating the Bees to an 11th-place finish.

Season summary 
It was all change at Griffin Park during the 1986 off-season. Assistant manager John Docherty left the club to become manager of Millwall and took long-serving defender Danis Salman with him, for a "ridiculous" £20,000 fee which was settled by tribunal. Manager Frank McLintock released midfielders Terry Bullivant, Tony Lynch, George Torrance and forwards Rowan Alexander and Steve Butler. Wimbledon winger Ian Holloway's loan was made permanent for a £28,000 fee and also arriving at Griffin Park were defender Phil Bater, midfielder Paul Maddy and forward Gary Stevens. The marquee signing of Chelsea winger Paul Canoville was set to be decided by tribunal, but fell through after Reading won the day with a £60,000 bid.

A poor start to the season led manager Frank McLintock to continue to act in the transfer market during the opening months. £35,000 midfielder Wayne Turner was installed as the new captain, Tony Obi arrived on loan and Henry Hughton and Robbie Carroll joined on non-contract terms. Brentford continued to tread water in the lower reaches of mid-table through November and December 1986 and McLintock attempted to remedy the situation by signing experienced defenders Steve Perryman and Micky Droy. By January 1987, the Brentford supporters were calling for the sacking of McLintock and after a 4–1 defeat to Port Vale on 24 January, the club's board announced that his contract would not be renewed at the end of the season. McLintock immediately left the club.

After Frank McLintock's departure, player Steve Perryman was announced as caretaker manager. An immediate turnaround in the team's form led the board, who had reportedly shown interest in Wimbledon's Dave Bassett, to appoint Perryman to the role on a permanent basis in late-February 1987. He made two important additions to the club's staff, appointing Phil Holder as assistant manager and signing forward Gary Blissett for a £60,000 fee from Crewe Alexandra. Perryman lost just five of his first 23 games in the job and steered Brentford to an 11th-place finish.

League table

Results
Brentford's goal tally listed first.

Legend

Pre-season and friendlies

Football League Third Division

FA Cup

Football League Cup

Football League Trophy 

 Sources: 100 Years of Brentford, The Big Brentford Book of the Eighties,Croxford, Lane & Waterman, p. 400-403. Statto

Playing squad 
Players' ages are as of the opening day of the 1986–87 season.

 Sources: The Big Brentford Book of the Eighties, Timeless Bees

Coaching staff

Frank McLintock (23 August 1986 – 24 January 1987)

Steve Perryman (24 January – 9 May 1987)

Statistics

Appearances and goals
Substitute appearances in brackets.

Players listed in italics left the club mid-season.
Source: The Big Brentford Book of the Eighties

Goalscorers 

Players listed in italics left the club mid-season.
Source: The Big Brentford Book of the Eighties

Management

Summary

Transfers & loans

Awards 
 Supporters' Player of the Year: Andy Sinton
 Players' Player of the Year: Gary Phillips

References 

Brentford F.C. seasons
Brentford